Jim Mankins is a former running back in the National Football League (NFL).

Biography
Mankins was born James Frank Mankins on June 23, 1944 in Chino, California.

Career
He played at the collegiate level at Florida State University and the University of Oklahoma.

Mankins was drafted in the twelfth round of the 1966 NFL Draft by the Green Bay Packers. He had also been drafted in the second round of the Red Shirt portion of the 1966 American Football League Draft by the Miami Dolphins. Mankins would go on to play for the Atlanta Falcons.

After playing in the NFL, Mankins would play 3 seasons in the Canadian Football League. With the Ottawa Rough Riders from 1968 to 1970, he would win two Grey Cup championships. He was traded to the Edmonton Eskimos in 1970, finishing his football career there.

References

1944 births
Living people
American football running backs
Atlanta Falcons players
Edmonton Elks players
Florida State University alumni
Florida State Seminoles football players
Oklahoma Sooners football players
Ottawa Rough Riders players
People from Chino, California
Players of American football from California
Sportspeople from San Bernardino County, California
University of Oklahoma alumni